Monno Ceramic is a ceramic tableware manufacturing companies in Bangladesh. Based in Dhaka, the company was established in 1984 by the late Harunur Rashid Khan Monno.

References 

Ceramics manufacturers of Bangladesh
Manufacturing companies based in Dhaka
Manufacturing companies established in 1985
Bangladeshi brands
1985 establishments in Bangladesh